The men's BMX competition of the cycling events at the 2015 Pan American Games was held between July 10 and 11 at the Centennial Park Pan Am BMX Centre in Toronto, Ontario, Canada.

Schedule
All times are Eastern Standard Time (UTC-3).

Results

Time Trials

Quarterfinals
First 4 riders in each quarterfinal qualify to semifinal.

Semifinal
The top four cyclists advanced to the final.

Final

References

Cycling at the 2015 Pan American Games
2015 in BMX
BMX at the Pan American Games